Heterodermia is a genus of lichenized fungi in the family Physciaceae. The genus has a widespread distribution, especially in tropical regions, and contains about 80 species.

Description
Heterodermia are subterranean or almost upright leaf lichens with a bearing diameter of up to 10 centimeters.  Their top is pale greenish, whitish or pale greyish, many species are ciliolate on the edge.  The underside is white, tan or orange with pale or dark rhizines.

Lichenoverruculina is lichenicolous (a parasitic fungus that only lives on lichen as the host) and is found under the thallus of various Heterodermia species.

Distribution
The genus Heterodermia has about 80 species a large area of distribution, especially in the tropics.

Species
As accepted by Species Fungorum;

Heterodermia andina 
Heterodermia angustiloba 
Heterodermia antillarum 
Heterodermia archeri 
Heterodermia arvidssonii 
Heterodermia badia 
Heterodermia barbifera 
Heterodermia comosa 
Heterodermia coralloides 
Heterodermia corcovadensis 
Heterodermia diademata 
Heterodermia dissecta 
Heterodermia domingensis 
Heterodermia erecta 
Heterodermia erinacea 
Heterodermia fragmentata 
Heterodermia galactophylla 
Heterodermia himalayena 
Heterodermia hybocarponica 
Heterodermia isidiophora 
Heterodermia isidiophorella 
Heterodermia kalbii 
Heterodermia koyana 
Heterodermia koyanoides 
Heterodermia langdoniana 
Heterodermia mobergiana 
Heterodermia neocomosa 
Heterodermia neoleucomelaena 
Heterodermia obscurata 
Heterodermia orientalis 
Heterodermia parva 
Heterodermia pindurae 
Heterodermia podocarpa 
Heterodermia pseudospeciosa 
Heterodermia queensberryi 
Heterodermia ramosociliata 
Heterodermia rubrotricha 
Heterodermia sinocomosa 
Heterodermia sorediosa 
Heterodermia speciosa 
Heterodermia subcitrina 
Heterodermia subcomosa 
Heterodermia tabularis 
Heterodermia tasmanica 
Heterodermia upretii 
Heterodermia urtasuni 
Heterodermia velata 
Heterodermia verdonii 

Former species (all still placed within the Physciaceae family);
 H. albicans  = Polyblastidium albicans
 H. appalachensis  = Leucodermia appalachensis
 H. appendiculata  = Polyblastidium appendiculatum
 H. aquila  = Kurokawia runcinata
 H. aquila var. stippaea  = Kurokawia stippaea
 H. arsenei  = Leucodermia arsenei
 H. arsenei  = Leucodermia arsenei
 H. boryi  = Leucodermia boryi
 H. boryi f. circinalis  = Leucodermia circinalis
 H. casarettiana  = Polyblastidium casarettianum
 H. chilensis  = Polyblastidium chilense
 H. ciliatomarginata  = Leucodermia ciliatomarginata
 H. circinalis  = Leucodermia circinalis
 H. corallophora  = Polyblastidium corallophorum
 H. crocea  = Klauskalbia crocea
 H. dendritica  = Polyblastidium dendriticum
 H. dendritica var. propagulifera  = Polyblastidium propaguliferum
 H. desertorum  = Kashiwadia nubila
 H. diademata var. koyana  = Heterodermia koyana
 H. dissecta var. koyana  = Heterodermia koyana
 H. fertilis  = Leucodermia fertilis
 H. flabellata  = Klauskalbia flabellata
 H. flabellata var. corcovadensis  = Heterodermia corcovadensis
 H. fragilissima  = Polyblastidium fragilissimum
 H. hypocaesia  = Polyblastidium hypocaesium
 H. hypoleuca  = Polyblastidium hypoleucum
 H. hypoleuca var. divergens  = Polyblastidium hypoleucum
 H. isidiophora sensu auct. brit., non  = Heterodermia speciosa
 H. isidiophora var. coralligera  = Heterodermia isidiophora
 H. japonica sensu auct. brit. = Heterodermia obscurata
 H. japonica  = Polyblastidium japonicum
 H. japonica var. reagens  = Polyblastidium propaguliferum
 H. leucomelos  = Leucodermia leucomelos
 H. leucomelos f. albociliata  = Leucodermia leucomelos
 H. leucomelos subsp. boryi  = Leucodermia boryi
 H. lutescens  = Leucodermia lutescens
 H. magellanica  = Polyblastidium magellanicum
 H. major  = Heterodermia diademata
 H. microphylla  = Polyblastidium microphyllum
 H. neglecta  = Polyblastidium neglectum
 H. neoleucomelaena f. circinalis  = Leucodermia circinalis
 H. obscurata sensu auct. brit., non  = Polyblastidium japonicum
 H. paradoxa  = Klauskalbia paradoxa
 H. propagulifera sensu auct. brit., = Heterodermia obscurata
 H. propagulifera  = Polyblastidium propaguliferum
 H. queenslandica  = Polyblastidium queenslandicum
 H. reagens  = Polyblastidium propaguliferum
 H. speciosa f. isidiophora  = Heterodermia isidiophora
 H. speciosa var. domingensis  = Heterodermia domingensis
 H. speciosa var. isidiophora  = Heterodermia isidiophora
 H. speciosa var. obscurata  = Heterodermia obscurata
 H. squamulosa  = Polyblastidium squamulosum
 H. subneglecta  = Polyblastidium subneglectum
 H. togashii  = Polyblastidium togashii
 H. violostriata  = Polyblastidium violostriatum
 H. vulgaris  = Leucodermia vulgaris

References

Caliciales genera
Caliciales
Lichen genera
Taxa named by Vittore Benedetto Antonio Trevisan de Saint-Léon
Taxa described in 1868